Salisbury House or Salisbury Farm and variations may refer to:

in Canada
Salisbury House (Canada), a restaurant chain

in England
Cecil House, the London home of the earls of Salisbury
Salisbury House, Edmonton, a late 16th/early 17th century building in Edmonton, London

in the United States (by state then town)
Salisbury House (Des Moines, Iowa), listed on the NRHP in Iowa
Salisbury Plantation (Westover, Maryland), listed on the NRHP in Maryland
Jonas Salisbury House (62 Walnut Park), Newton, Massachusetts, listed on the NRHP in Middlesex County
Jonas Salisbury House (85 Langley Road), Newton, Massachusetts, listed on the NRHP in Middlesex County
Salisbury House (Worcester, Massachusetts), listed on the NRHP
Salisbury Mansion and Store, Worcester, Massachusetts
Salisbury Plantation (Woodville, Mississippi), listed on the NRHP in Wilkinson County
Salisbury Farm (Bridgeport, New Jersey), listed on the NRHP in Gloucester County
Charles M. Salisbury House, Lacona, New York, listed on the NRHP in Oswego County, New York
Salisbury Manor, Leeds, New York, listed on the NRHP
George Bradshaw House and Joshua Salisbury/George Bradshaw Barn, Wellsville, Utah, listed on the NRHP in Cache County
Salisbury (Chesterfield County, Virginia), an 18th century plantation

See also
Salisbury Plantation (disambiguation)